Savanović (Cyrillic script: Савановић) is a Serbian surname. It may refer to:

Duško Savanović (born 1983), basketball player
Miroslav Savanović (born 1985), football midfielder
Sava Savanović, legendary vampire

Serbian surnames